This is a list of mayors of Cardiff, Wales. The first mayor recorded for Cardiff was in 1126 though the title was generally given to the Constable or military governor of Cardiff Castle. The first elected Mayor of Cardiff took office in 1835 (elected by the members of the council), the same year the first council elections were held. When Cardiff was granted city status in 1905 the post holder was given the title Lord Mayor (Welsh: Arglwydd Faer). The Lord Mayor of Cardiff is considered to be the first citizen of Wales and since 1956 has enjoyed the style of The Right Honourable.

History
The first mayor of Cardiff is listed by the County Borough Records as Ralph "Prepositus de Kardi" who took up office in 1126. In 1835, Thomas Revel Guest became the first elected mayor of Cardiff when the first council elections were held. When Cardiff was granted city status in 1905 Cardiff's First Citizen became lord mayor. Robert Hughes, the mayor in 1904, was re-elected to become Cardiff's first lord mayor in the following year. The lord mayor was granted the right to the style "The Right Honourable." The lord mayor now bears the style "The Right Honourable the Lord Mayor of Cardiff".

In 1999 a new system was introduced whereby the leader of the council could also serve as mayor for the duration of the council without re-election. This led to Russell Goodway serving as both council leader and mayor from 1999 to 2003. From 2003 the mayoralty reverted to a separate role, elected annually.

The official residence of the Lord Mayor of Cardiff was the Mansion House, Cardiff, although the Lord Mayors have not lived there since 1971.

Elected mayors since 1835
The years given are for when each mayor took office. Most mayoral terms extended into the following year.
 1836: Thomas Revell Guest, from 1 January Also Judge of the Borough Court of Record.
 1836: Charles Crofts Williams, from 9 November
 1837: Henry Morgan
 1838: Charles Crofts Williams
 1839: Richard Reece
 1840: David Evans
 1841: James Lewis
 1842: Charles Crofts Williams
 1843: John Moore
 1844: William Jonas Watson, who died in October but was not immediately replaced
 1845: Richard Reece
 1846: James Lewis
 1847: Richard Lewis Reece
 1848: Walter Coffin, later a member of parliament for Cardiff
 1849: Charles Vachell
 1850: William Bird
 1851: Griffith Phillips
 1852: William Williams
 1853: John Batchelor, a Liberal mayor dubbed "Friend of Freedom"
 1854: David Lewis
 1855: Charles Vachell
 1856: Sydney Dan Jenkins
 1857: Charles Crofts Williams
 1858: Charles Crofts Williams
 1859: William Alexander
 1860: Charles Williams David
 1861: John Bird or Charles Williams David
 1862: James Pride or John Bird
 1863: John Bird
 1864: James Pride
 1865: William Bradley Watkins
 1866: Charles Williams David
 1867: Richard Lewis Reece
 1868: Thomas Evans
 1869: Edward Whiffen
 1870: Charles Williams David
 1871: Charles Williams David
 1872: Henry Bowen
 1873: William Vachell (father of Ada Vachell)
 1874: Daniel Jones
 1875: Daniel Jones
 1876: Joseph Elliott
 1877: William Taylor
 1878: Daniel Lewis
 1879: John MacConnochie
 1880: Rees Jones
 1881: Alfred Thomas or Sir Alfred Gaius Augustus Stone
 1882: Sir Alfred Gaius Augustus Stone
 1883: Robert Bird - Father of (Sir) Charles Bird, Lord Mayor in 1910
 1884: Andrew Fulton
 1885: David Edgar Jones MD
 1886: Sir Morgan Morgan (knighted while in office)
 1887: Thomas Windsor Jacobs
 1888: David Jones
 1889: William Sanders
 1890: John Patrick Crichton-Stuart, Marquess of Bute
 1891: Thomas Rees
 1892: William Edmund Vaughan
 1893: William John Trounce
 1894: Patrick William Carey
 1895: Robert George, Baron Windsor
 1896: Ebenezer Beavan
 1897: Joseph Ramsdale
 1898: Thomas Morel or Thomas More
 1899: Samuel Arthur Brain, founder of Brains Brewery in 1882
 1900: Thomas Andrews – Cllr John Jenkins, a councillor for 10 years, had initially been elected to the post. It was the first time the position of mayor had been offered to a Labour councillor. However, Jenkins refused the post and left the council chamber. Andrews was elected following a second vote.
 1901: Frank John Beavan
 1902: Edward Thomas (Liberal party)
 1903: John Jenkins
 1904: Robert Hughes

Lord mayors since 1905
 1905: Robert Hughes, the sitting mayor who was (re)elected Lord Mayor in 1905
 1906: Sir William Smith Crossman (knighted while still in office by King Edward VII on his visit to Cardiff on 13 July 1907)
 1907: (Sir) Illtyd Thomas (knighted after leaving office)
 1908: Lewis Morgan
 1909: John Chappell
 1910: (Sir) Charles Hayward Bird (knighted after leaving office) - son of Robert Bird, Mayor in 1883.
 1911: Sir John Wesley Courtis (knighted while still in office)
 1912: Morgan Thomas
 1913: James Robinson
 1914: John Thomas Richards
 1915: Dr Robert James Smith
 1916: Joseph Stanfield
 1917: William Roberts
 1918: (Sir) Amos Child Kirk (knighted after leaving office)
 1919: George Frederick Forsdike
 1920: James Taylor
 1921: Francis Harold Turnbull
 1922: John James Edgerton Biggs
 1923: Sydney Osborne Jenkins
 1924: William Hampton Pethybridge
 1925: William Francis
 1926: William Grey
 1927: Arthur John Howell
 1928: (Sir) William Richard Williams (knighted after leaving office)
 1929: William Charles
 1930: Robert Gerard Hill-Snook
 1931: (Sir) Charles William Melhuish (knighted after leaving office)
 1932: Charles Fletcher Sanders
 1933: (Sir) Arthur Ernest Gough (knighted after leaving office)
 1934: John Donovan, former docker and secretary for the South Wales and Monmouthshire Area of the TGWU 
 1935: George Frederick Evans
 1936: Sir Herbert Hiles (knighted while still in office)
 1937: Oliver Cuthbert Purnell
 1938: William Gough Howell
 1939: Henry Johns
 1940: Charles Henry McCale
 1941: James Hellyer
 1942: James Griffiths
 1943: Frederick Jones
 1944: Walter Howell Parker
 1945: Walter Robert Wills
 1946: George James Ferguson
 1947: Richard Gruffydd Robinson
 1948: Richard Gruffydd Robinson
 1949: Timothy James Kerrigan
 1950: George Williams
 1951: Robert Bevan
 1952: William Henry James Muston
 1953: Sir James Patrick Collins (knighted while still in office)
 1954: George Llewellyn Ferrier
 1955: Frank Chapman
 1956: (Sir) Daniel Thomas Williams (knighted after leaving office)
 1957: John Hinds Morgan
 1958: Arthur James Williams
 1959: Helena Evans, Cardiff's first female Lord Mayor
 1960: Mary Dorothy Lewis
 1961: Edward Ewart Pearce
 1962: Clifford Arthur Bence
 1963: Charles Augustine Horwood
 1964: William John Hartland
 1965: Miriam Clarice Bryant
 1966: Herbert Edward Edmonds
 1967: Eric Charles Dolman, previously a first class cricketer
 1968: Sir James Reginald Lyons (knighted while still in office)
 1969: (Sir) Lincoln Hallinan (knighted after leaving office)
 1970: Thomas Ernest Merrells
 1971: Hugh Ferguson-Jones
 1972: Winifred Rachel Mathias
 1973: Gerald Alan Smith Turnbull
 1974: Albert Arthur Huish
 1975: Sir Charles Hallinan (father of Sir Lincoln Hallinan who had preceded him as Lord Mayor in 1969)
 1976: John Iorwerth Jones
 1977: David C. Purnell
 1978: William Henry Carling
 1979: Bella Brown
 1980: John Charles Edwards
 1981: Ronald Frederick Watkiss
 1982: Philip Dunleavy (Labour), a retired post office worker
 1983: Olwen Mary Watkin
 1984: Albert William 'Bill' Buttle (Labour), a retired engine driver
 1985: Captain Norman Lloyd-Edwards, also Lord Lieutenant of South Glamorgan 1990 to 2008
 1986: David Myfyr Evans
 1987: Julius Hermer
 1988: William Penry Herbert
 1989: Mary Elizabeth (Beti) Jones JP, the first Girl Guide Lord Mayor of Cardiff.
 1990: John Smith (Labour)
 1991: Jeffrey Sainsbury (Conservative), came to office earlier than expected, after two nominees lost their seats in the May 1991 election.
 1992: Derek Allinson
 1993: Victor Riley
 1994: Ricky Ormonde
 1995: Timothy Davies
 1996: John Phillips
 1997: Max Phillips
 1998: Marion Drake
 1999: Russell Goodway (Labour). From 1999 council elections, the Leader of the council was nominated as Lord Mayor for the lifetime of the council.
 2000: Russell Goodway
 2001: Russell Goodway
 2002: Russell Goodway
 2003: Gordon Houlston (Labour). From 2003 election, reverted to annual appointment of Lord Mayor.
 2004: Jacqui Gasson, the city's first Liberal Democrat Lord Mayor
 2005: Freda Salway (Liberal Democrat) 
 2006: Gareth Neale (Conservative)
 2007: Gill Bird (Labour)
 2008: Kate Lloyd (Liberal Democrat)
 2009: Brian Griffiths (Conservative)
 2010: Keith Hyde (Liberal Democrat) 
 2011: Delme Bowen, the city's first Plaid Cymru Lord Mayor
 2012: Derrick Morgan, from 27 September 2012 – between May and September 2012 the position of Lord Mayor was unfilled, while the new Labour council attempted to split the responsibilities of the mayor between two councillors. Cllr Cerys Furlong (Labour) filled the traditional mayoral role of Chair of the Council during this period.
 2013: Derrick Morgan (Labour) 
 2014: Margaret Jones (Liberal Democrat)
 2015: David Walker (Conservative)
 2016: Monica Walsh (Labour) 
 2017: Bob Derbyshire (Labour)
 2018: Dianne Rees (Conservative) 
 2019: Daniel De'Ath (Labour), Cardiff's first black mayor 
 2020–2022: Rod McKerlich (Conservative)
 2022: Graham Hinchey (Labour)

See also
Cardiff Council
Cardiff City Council
Cardiff County Borough Council
Mayors in Wales

References

External links 
 The Lord Mayor (Cardiff Council webpage)

Mayors
Cardiff
Local government in Wales
 
Politics of Cardiff
Mayors of Cardiff